Champion is a surname.

 Notable people so named include:
 Albert Champion, several people, including
 Albert Champion (cricketer) (1851–1909), Yorkshire cricketer
 Albert Champion (cyclist) (1878–1927), French road racing cyclist and spark plug manufacturer
 Andrew Champion (born 1970), stage name of Andrew Jennati Ataie, American punk rock singer
 Beau Champion (born 1986), Australian rugby league footballer
 Bill Champion, several people, including
 Bill Champion (actor), British actor in Rockliffe's Babies
 Bill Champion (baseball) (1947–2017), American Major League Baseball player
 Bill Champion (racing driver) (1921–1991), American stock car racing driver
 Bob Champion (born 1948), English jump jockey and subject of the 1983 film Champions
 Bobby Joe Champion (born 1963), American politician
 Cari Champion (born 1978), American television journalist
 Charles Champion (born 1955), French engineer and Airbus executive
 Chris Champion (1961–2018), American professional wrestler
 Epaphroditus Champion (1756–1834), American politician
 Étienne Marie Antoine Champion de Nansouty (1768–1815), French cavalry commander
 Francis Henry Champion (c. 1817–1902) soap manufacturer in South Australia
 Frederick Walter Champion (1893–1970), English forester and wildlife photographer, who pioneered camera trapping
 George Champion (disambiguation), several people, including
 George Champion (cricketer) (1867–1933), English cricketer
 George Champion (politician) (1713–1754), English MP
 George Charles Champion (1851–1927), English entomologist
 Gower Champion (1919–1980), American dancer and choreographer, dance partner of wife Marge Champion
 Grady Champion (born 1969), American blues harmonicist, singer, guitarist and songwriter
 Greg Champion (born c. 1960), Australian songwriter, guitarist and radio personality
 Harry Champion (1866–1942), stage name of William Henry Crump, British music hall composer and performer
 Henry Champion (general) (1751–1836) American general in the Continental Army
 Henry Hyde Champion (1859–1928), Australian social reformer and journalist
 Ian Champion (born 1968), English actor
 Jacques Champion de Chambonnières (c. 1601–1672), French Baroque composer also known as Jacques Champion
 Jeanne Champion (born 1931), French painter and writer
 John Champion, several people, including
 John C. Champion (1923–1994), American producer and screenwriter
 John George Champion (1815–1854), English soldier, botanist, and explorer
 Jon Champion (born 1965), English football commentator
 Malcolm Champion (1883–1939), New Zealand's first Olympic swimmer and gold medalist
 Marge Champion (1919–2020), American dancer and choreographer, dance partner of husband Gower Champion
 Mark Champion, American radio sportscaster, voice of the Detroit Pistons
 Matt Champion, American rapper, member of hip-hop collective Brockhampton
 Michael Champion, several people including
 Michael Champion, American singer
 Mike Champion (baseball) (born 1955), Major League Baseball player
 Mike Champion (basketball) (born 1964), American basketball player
 Nate Champion Nathan D. Champion (1857–1892) — American rancher murdered after being labeled a rustler
 Nick Champion (born 1972), Australian politician
 Nicolas Champion (c. 1475–1533), Franco-Flemish Renaissance composer in the Habsburg court
 Patricia Champion, known as Patricia C. Frist, American businesswoman and philanthropist
 Percy Champion (1887–1957), English footballer 
 Philip Champion (born 1976), American basketball player
 Rafe Champion (born 1945), Australian writer
 Reed Champion (1910–1997), American artist
 Richard Champion (born 1968), former Australian rules footballer
 Robert Champion, see also Bob Champion above
 Sam Champion (born 1961), American weather anchor
 Todd Champion (born 1960), American retired professional wrestler
 Tom Champion Thomas Matthew Champion (born 1986), English (soccer) footballer
 Tony Champion (born 1963), American football player
 William Champion, several people, including
 William Champion (metallurgist), an early producer of zinc in the United Kingdom
 William Julius Champion Jr., inventor of board game Kalah
 Will Champion (born 1978), drummer/multi-instrumentalist for English band Coldplay

Champion de Crespigny
 Champion de Crespigny baronets, a line of English gentry
 Claude Champion de Crespigny (1873–1910), British soldier and polo player
 Sir Constantine Trent Champion de Crespigny (1882–1952), Australian academic and hospital administrator
 Frederick Champion de Crespigny (1822–1887), English first-class cricketer
 Hugh Champion de Crespigny (1897–1969), senior Royal Air Force officer
 Richard Champion de Crespigny (b. 1957), Australian airline pilot of Qantas Flight 32 engine failure incident
 Richard Rafe Champion de Crespigny (b. 1936), Australian academic and China specialist
 Robert Champion de Crespigny (born 1950), Australian mining magnate
 Rose Champion de Crespigny (c. 1859–1935), English artist and author